Mr. Hollywood Jr., 1947 is the fifth album by Michael Penn, originally released independently in 2005 on Mimeograph Records (Penn's United Musicians label) and distributed through SpinART Records. Legacy Recordings licensed the album for a 2007 reissue that included bonus tracks and a video.

The album's themes are framed by Penn's fascination with events taking place in 1947, which he describes as "the year everything changed." It is named for a Raymond Lark painting Penn had initially intended to use as the album's cover.

Track listing
All songs by Michael Penn
 "Walter Reed"
 "Denton Road"
 "Room 712, The Apache"
 "Pretending"
 "The Transistor"
 "Mary Lynn"
 "18 September"
 "The Television Set Waltz"
 "You Know How"
 "A Bad Sign"
 "O.K."
 "On Automatic"
 "(P.S.) Millionaire" (not listed in liner notes)

Legacy reissue bonus disc
Tracks 1–6 are live performances from a KCRW appearance
 "Walter Reed"
 "Bad Sign"
 "Denton Road"
 "I Can Tell"
 "Me Around"
 "O.K."
 Video for "Walter Reed"
 "Down by the Riverside" (hidden track)

Personnel
Michael Penn – dulcimer, bass, guitar, percussion, piano, Hammond organ, vocals
Aimee Mann – bass, vocals
Michael Bland – drums
Julian Coryell – slide guitar
Danny Frankel – drums
Buddy Judge – harmony vocals
Gary Louris – harmony vocals
Patrick Warren – piano, Fender Rhodes, pianette
Jebin Bruni – piano, pianette
Dave Palmer – piano
Sheldon Gomberg – upright bass
Justin Rocherolle – drums

References

External links
 Official site; includes audio samples and lyrics
 Mr. Hollywood Jr., 1947 media kit

2005 albums
Michael Penn albums
United Musicians albums